Anton Leonhard Dunckern (29 June 1905 in Munich – 9 December 1985 in Munich) was a German SS-Brigadeführer.

Life 
Born the son of a judicial bailiff Dunckern grew up in Munich. After attending a grammar school he studied Law at the University of Munich, passing the First State Examination in 1930 and the Great State Examination in early 1933.

Early on in life Dunckern got involved in far right-wing politics in Southern Germany: In 1922, when he was seventeen, he joined the Freikorps Lauterbach, an association of volunteers serving as a supplementary to the regular German Army, where he met Heinrich Himmler. Both men became close friends at that time, remaining on a first-name basis for the rest of their lives. In 1923 Dunckern became a member of the Freikorps Oberland - an organization similar to the Corps of Hartmann Lauterbacher - with which he took part in the failed Beer Hall Putsch of November 1923.

In September 1930 Dunckern joined the NSDAP and the SS, which by that time was spearheaded by his friend Himmler. Being a personal friend of the SS-chief and a highly educated academician Dunckern managed to advance swiftly within the ranks of the SS after the Nazi seizure of power in Germany in 1933: During the coup that brought the NSDAP to power in the State of Bavaria in March 1933 Dunckern, on behalf of Himmler, commanded the SS-troopers that occupied and guarded the Government buildings in Munich. In April he was appointed as an officer in the Bavarian Political Police, which at that time was Himmler's central power tool within the state apparatus.

When Himmler and his deputy Heydrich migrated from Munich to Berlin in April 1934 in order to take control of the Gestapo they took Dunckern along. In the following months he participated in reorganizing the Gestapo in accordance with the plans of the SS-leaders, thus decisively contributing to consolidating their power.

During the Nazi-government's purge of 30 June to 2 July 1934 Dunckern played a key-role in clamping down on his masters' adversaries in Berlin: He led the SS-troop that occupied the offices of Hitler's conservative Vice-Chancellor Franz von Papen. During this raid Papen's chief of press Herbert von Bose, the organiser of the political opposition to Nazi rule within the government apparatus, was shot and several other staffers were taken prisoner and dragged to concentration camps. On the night of 30 June to 1 July, Dunckern led a group of Gestapo agents who tried to execute the disgraced former NSDAP politician Paul Schulz in a forest outside of Berlin, who, however, managed to slip out of his would-be-killers clutches.

From July to December 1934 Dunckern reorganized the Gestapo in Breslau and Liegnitz in Silesia. In March 1935 he was appointed to the office of chief of the Gestapo in Saarbrücken thus being placed in charge of the Gestapo within the whole Saar area.

In early 1939 Dunckern was transferred to Brunswick  as inspector of the Security Police and the SD supervising political, criminal police as well SS intelligence service in his area.

In July 1940 Dunckern was appointed commander of the Security Police and the SD in Saar-Lorraine. In 1942 he was promoted to the rank of a SS-Brigadeführer. Following the Allied invasion of Europe in the summer of 1944 Himmler placed Dunckern in charge of the SS and police in the defence section of Metz.

During the liberation of Metz by American troops of the 3rd US-Army on the night of 19 November 1944 Dunckern was taken prisoner. Due to the fact that Dunckern by that time was the highest-ranking SS-member to have been captured within his area of command, General George Patton took it upon himself to interrogate the prisoner personally. Patton, deciding that Dunckern was a ″viper″ and a ″low type″ of policeman, had him classified as a political detainee instead of a prisoner of war.

Until early April 1945 Dunckern was kept as a prisoner in England. Afterwards he was transferred to a camp for captured generals in the US. In the summer of 1946 Dunckern was returned to Europe. From the summer of 1946 until the autumn of 1947 he was imprisoned in a camp for generals in Garmisch in Southern Germany. Afterwards he was imprisoned in a military penitentiary in Metz until the spring of 1953. From 31 May to 1 July 1953, Dunckern was tried as a war criminal before the Military Court of the 6th Region in Metz: he was sentenced to 20 years of hard labor.

In June 1954 Dunckern was granted an early release from a prison in the Loos district of Lille. He returned to Germany, where he settled down in Munich, opening a law firm in 1956. Following a severe encephalitis attack in 1962 he became paraplegic. Due to his old age and feeble health he gave up his law license in 1970.

In 1970 and 1971 the district attorney in Munich investigated Dunckern due to the suspicion that he had aided mass murder in his capacity as chief of police in Metz during the war. Specifically it was assumed that the agency run by Dunckern had been involved in the organization of the deportation of French Jews to Eastern Europe from 1942 to 1944. Since Dunckern denied those charges and since no evidence could be uncovered proving the opposite, the investigation was finally dropped in May 1971.

Dunckern died in 1985 following a lengthy ailment. He is buried in the Ostfriedhof (eastern graveyard) of Munich. In accordance with his instructions, Dunckern's sister burned all his private papers after his death.

Literature 
 Dieter Wolfanger: „Der erste Gestapo-Chef des Saarlandes und spätere Befehlshaber der Sicherheitspolizei und des SD in Lothringen-Saarpfalz“, in: Jahrbuch für westdeutsche Landesgeschichte 18 (1992), p. 303-324.
 Ernst Klee: Das Personenlexikon zum Dritten Reich, Frankfurt 2007.
 Andreas Schulz/Günter Wegmann  Die Generale der Waffen-SS und der Polizei Biblio Verlag 2003 Band 1  pages 264 - 266.

References

1905 births
1985 deaths
Gestapo personnel
Military personnel from Munich
SS and Police Leaders
Burials at the Ostfriedhof (Munich)
People from the Kingdom of Bavaria
SS-Brigadeführer
20th-century Freikorps personnel